Sar Borj (also known as Sard Borj) is a village in Torqabeh Rural District, Torqabeh District, Torqabeh and Shandiz County, Razavi Khorasan Province, Iran. At the 2006 census, its population was 175, in 44 families.

References 

Populated places in Torqabeh and Shandiz County